War of Attrition is the fifth album by Dying Fetus. According to the album booklet, the album's lyrics were written solely by guitarist Mike Kimball. This album was praised by original fans due to its return to traditional Dying Fetus form but was also criticized for its poor production in comparison to other releases. It was also their first self-produced album in nine years.

Former co-vocalist Vince Matthews and former drummer Eric Seyanga departed in 2005 to form the band Covenance. Gallagher once again found a new member, drummer Duane Timlin. With this line-up, Gallagher promised to record what he called "our most brutal album yet".

It is perhaps Dying Fetus' most politically influenced album, containing lyrics that tackled the "war on terror", "reality" TV, and the flaws in the American justice system.

Track listing

Personnel
John Gallagher –  guitars, vocals
Mike Kimball – guitars
Sean Beasley – bass guitar, vocals
Duane Timlin – drums

References 

Dying Fetus albums
2007 albums
Relapse Records albums